The Ch'ŏngch'ŏn is a river in North Korea having its source in the Rangrim Mountains of Chagang Province and emptying into the Yellow Sea at Sinanju. The river flows past Myohyang-san and through the city of Anju, South P'yŏngan Province. Its total length is 217 km (135 mi), and it drains a basin of 9,553 km2 (3,688 sq mi).

Important Bird Area
The river's estuary has been identified by BirdLife International as an 8000 ha (19,768 acre) Important Bird Area (IBA) because it supports significant numbers of the populations of various bird species. These include swan geese, bean geese, whooper swans, Oriental storks, black-faced spoonbills, Chinese egrets, great bustards, white-naped cranes, hooded cranes, red-crowned cranes, Far Eastern curlews and spotted greenshanks. The site includes the 800 ha (1,977 acre) Mundok Nature Reserve.

Hydroelectric dams 
North Korea is building 10 new hydroelectric dams on the Chongchon River to spur rapid development.

Incidents 
In 612, Goguryeo massacred the Sui army at the Battle of Salsu (Ch'ongch'on) River in the Goguryeo-Sui Wars.
In late November 1950, in the Korean War, the Chinese army decisively defeated the UNC forces at the Battle of the Ch'ongch'on River  , ensuring the continued existence of North Korea.
U.S. Army defector Joseph T. White was reported to have drowned in the Ch'ongch'on River, according to a letter dated 22 August 1985 which had been sent to his family.

See also
 Rivers of Korea
 Battle of the Ch'ongch'on River
 Chong Chon Gang

References

External links 
Appearance of Chongchon River basin changes beyond recognition . KCNA, May 29, 2002.

Rivers of North Korea
South Pyongan
Important Bird Areas of North Korea
Wetlands of North Korea